Eisenberg Castle may refer to:

 Eisenberg Castle, Bavaria, a ruined castle in Bavaria
 Eisenberg Castle, Korbach, a ruined castle in Hesse

Architectural disambiguation pages